Dotin (full name Datis Arian Qeshm) is an Iranian company that operates in the fields of information technology, software production, financial services and security. The company was founded in 2005 and is owned by the Fanap Holding Company associated with Pasargad Financial Group.

References 

Iranian companies established in 2005
Software companies of Iran